Lauterach Transmitter is a broadcasting facility in Lauterach, Austria, located at  .  It is used for FM and TV broadcasting, and until 1995 also for medium-wave broadcasting.It was inaugurated in 1934 and uses as antenna mast a 116 metre tall guyed mast, which is insulated against ground.

References

Towers in Austria
Towers completed in 1934
Communications in Austria
Buildings and structures in Vorarlberg
1934 establishments in Austria
20th-century architecture in Austria